This is a list of Airdrieonians Football Club's seasons since the club's formation in 2002–03 as Airdrie United (having purchased and rebranded Clydebank to secure a Scottish Football League place, after the original Airdrieonians went out of business) up to the present day. The list details Airdrie's record in major league and cup competitions, and the club's top league goal scorer of each season.

Seasons

As Airdrie United

As Airdrieonians

Key

 P = Played
 W = Games won
 D = Games drawn
 L = Games lost
 F = Goals for
 A = Goals against
 Pts = Points
 Pos = Final position

 R1 = Round 1
 R2 = Round 2
 R3 = Round 3
 R4 = Round 4
 R5 = Round 5
 QF = Quarter-finals
 SF = Semi-finals

 SFL 1 = Scottish First Division
 SFL 2 = Scottish Second Division

Footnotes

a. Relegated after defeat in play-offs.
b. Defeated in play-off final but secured promotion to the First Division due to the demise of Gretna.
c. Defeated in play-off final but maintained First Division status due to the demotion of Livingston to the Third Division.
d. The 2019–20 Scottish League One was curtailed due to the COVID-19 pandemic, with league positions, promotions and relegations decided on a points-per-game basis.

League performance summary 
The Scottish Football League was founded in 1890 and, other than during seven years of hiatus during World War II, the national top division has been played every season since. The following is a summary of Airdrieonians' divisional status since their move from Clydebank in 2002:

18 total eligible seasons (including 2019–20)
0 seasons in top level
6 seasons in second level
12 seasons in third level
0 seasons in fourth level

References

External links
Airdrieonians at Soccerbase
Airdrieonians at FitbaStats
Airdrie United at Football Club History Database (2002 to 2013)
Airdrieonians at Football Club History Database (from 2013)

Seasons
 
Airdrie United